The Grumman E-1 Tracer (WF prior to 1962)  was the first purpose-built airborne early warning aircraft used by the United States Navy. It was a derivative of the Grumman C-1 Trader and entered service in 1958. It was replaced by the more modern Grumman E-2 Hawkeye by the 1970s.

Design and development

The E-1 was designated WF under the 1922 United States Navy aircraft designation system; the designation earned it the nickname "Willy Fudd". The Tracer was derived from the C-1 Trader, itself a derivative of the S-2 Tracker carrier-based antisubmarine aircraft, known as S2F under the old system, nicknamed "Stoof", leading to the WF/E-1, with its distinctive radome, being known as "Stoof with a Roof." The E-1 featured folding wings of a very particular design for compact storage aboard aircraft carriers; unlike the S-2 and C-1 in which the wings folded upwards, the radome atop the fuselage required the E-1's designers to re-adopt an updated version of the Grumman-patented "Sto-Wing" folding wing system, pioneered on their earlier Grumman F4F-4 Wildcat piston-engined fighter of the early-WW II period, to fold its wings aftwards along the sides of the fuselage.

Radar
The Tracer was fitted with the Hazeltine AN/APS-82 in its radome and fuselage. The radar featured an Airborne Moving Target Indicator, which compares the video of one pulse time to the next in reflected radar energy to distinguish a flying aircraft from the clutter produced by wave action at the ocean's surface. The energy reflected from an aircraft changes position rapidly compared to the energy reflected from the surrounding sea. Separating a moving object from stationary background is accomplished by suitable hardware.

Operational history

As one of the first carrier based early warning aircraft, the E-1 Tracer served from 1958 to 1977, although considered only an interim type, being replaced by the Grumman E-2 Hawkeye in the mid-1960s. During the early years of the Vietnam War, E-1s saw extensive service, providing combat air patrol (CAP) fighters with target vectors, and controlling Alpha strikes over North Vietnam. With a radius of 250–300 miles, the E-1B served as an early warning to strike aircraft, of enemy MiG's activity.

By May 1973, most E-1Bs were retired, with only four VAW-121 Tracers based at NAS Norfolk, Virginia, still in service. These aircraft were soon retired during mid-summer 1977 following a final cruise on board  and were ferried to the Davis-Monthan storage facility. The E-1B Tracer was struck from the inventory by 1977.

Variants

 XTF-1W Aerodynamic prototype (BuNo 136792) without electronics, later rebuilt as a standard C-1A, retaining the twin tail.
 XWF-1 The XTF-1W re-designated in the W-Warning category.
 WF-2 Production Airborne Early Warning version of the TF-1 Trader, redesignated E-1B in 1962, 88 built.
 E-1B WF-2 redesignated in 1962.

Operators

United States Navy

Aircraft on display
There are five E-1 Tracers preserved at museums throughout the United States:
E-1B, BuNo 147212: Intrepid Sea, Air & Space Museum, New York City
E-1B, BuNo 147217: New England Air Museum, Windsor Locks, Connecticut
E-1B, BuNo 147227: Pima Air & Space Museum, adjacent to Davis-Monthan AFB in Tucson, Arizona
E-1B, BuNo 148146: National Naval Aviation Museum, Naval Air Station Pensacola

Another 11 E-1 Tracers are in storage at United Aeronautical, an aircraft surplus yard located just outside Davis–Monthan Air Force Base in Tucson, Arizona. At least one of those aircraft (E-1B, BuNo 148922) was sold to a private collector in 2011 with the intent to restore to fly, although no updates on the project have been posted since 2012.

Specifications

See also

References

Notes

Bibliography

 Sullivan, Jim. S2F Tracker in Action (Aircraft in Action No. 100). Carrollton: Texas: Squadron/Signal Publications, 1990. .
 Winchester, Jim, ed. "Grumman S-2E/F/G/UP Tracker." Modern Military Aircraft (Aviation Factfile). Rochester, Kent, UK: Grange Books plc, 2004. .

External links

Global Security.org page on WF-2/E-1 Tracer
Airborne Moving Target Indicator (AMTI) explanation provided by Mercury Computer

E-001 Tracer
1950s United States special-purpose aircraft
High-wing aircraft
Carrier-based aircraft
AEW aircraft
Aircraft first flown in 1956
Twin piston-engined tractor aircraft